James Harris may refer to:

Politics 
James Harris (grammarian) (1709–1780), English politician and grammarian
James Harris, 1st Earl of Malmesbury (1746–1820), English diplomat
James Harris (Nova Scotia politician) (1777–1848), Canadian politician in Nova Scotia
James Harris, 3rd Earl of Malmesbury (1807–1889), British statesman
James Morrison Harris (1817–1898), United States Representative from Maryland
James Harris (North Carolina politician) (1832–1891), African-American North Carolina politician
James Charles Harris (1831–1904), British Consul at Nice
James E. Harris (1820–1923), American politician, Lieutenant Governor of Nebraska in 1897–99
James Harris, 5th Earl of Malmesbury (1872–1950), British peer and Conservative politician
James Harris (Socialist Workers Party politician) (born 1948), 2000 and 2004 United States presidential candidate for the Socialist Workers Party

Science 
J. Rendel Harris (1852–1941), English biblical scholar and curator of manuscripts
James Arthur Harris (1880–1930), American botanist and biometrician
James Andrew Harris (1932–2000), American scientist, codiscoverer of rutherfordium (1968) and dubnium (1970)
James T. Harris III (living), American educator and academic administrator
James S. Harris, Professor of Electrical Engineering, Applied Physics and Material Science at Stanford University

Sports

American football
James "Shack" Harris (born 1947), American football former quarterback and executive
James Harris (defensive end) (born 1968), American football former player
James Harris (linebacker) (born 1982), American football fullback/linebacker
James L. Harris (American football), college football player

Other sports
James Harris, 2nd Earl of Malmesbury (1778–1841), British hunter
Kamala (wrestler) (James Harris, 1950–2020), American professional wrestler
James Harris (rugby union) (born 1987), Welsh rugby union player
James Harris (baseball) (1858–1939), American baseball infielder
James Harris (cricketer, born 1990), Welsh cricketer
James Harris (cricketer, born 1838) (1838–1925), English soldier and cricketer
James Harris (Kittitian cricketer) (born 1954), Kittitian cricketer
James Harris (sprinter) (born 1991), American sprinter
Jamie Harris (footballer) (born 1979), Welsh footballer
Jay Harris (footballer, born 1987) (James William Harris, born 1987), English footballer

Others 
James Harris (comedy writer) (21st century), British comedian
James Harris (solicitor) (1940–2004), British legal scholar
James B. Harris (born 1928), American screenwriter, producer and director
James H. Harris (1828–1898), American Civil War soldier and Medal of Honor recipient
James L. Harris (1916–1944), American World War II soldier and Medal of Honor recipient
Cornbread Harris (James Samuel Harris, born 1927), American musician
James Samuel "Jimmy Jam" Harris III (born 1959), member of American R&B and pop production duo Jimmy Jam and Terry Lewis

See also
"The Daemon Lover" aka "James Harris", British ballad
Jim Harris (disambiguation)
Jimmy Harris (disambiguation)